Hangman Crossing is an unincorporated community in Jackson Township, Jackson County, Indiana, United States.

Etymology
The name originated in 1868, as six members of the Reno Gang were lynched by a vigilante mob numbering over 100, known as the Scarlet Mask Society or the Jackson County Vigilance Committee. The lynchings occurred on July 20 and 24, 1868.

A portion of the locale is now a small development of newer homes named "The Crossing", just west of Seymour on U.S. Route 50.

Geography

References

Unincorporated communities in Jackson County, Indiana
Unincorporated communities in Indiana